Arif Abdulla oglu Mirzayev (born April 10, 1944) is a Soviet, Russian, Azerbaijani composer, organist and pianist, Honored Art Worker of Azerbaijan (2011).

He is the founder of religious-memorial organ and polyphony music of Azerbaijan, and also sacrificial music of ancient Islam. He is the master of polistylistics of the modern music. He was nominated for the State Prize of the Russian Federation in 2000 and 2002 in the sphere of arts. He is the specialist in the sphere of J.S.Bach music, simultaneously being the propagandist of his activity. Arif Mirzoyev is the member of Composers’ Union of Russia and Azerbaijan since 1979, member of “New International Music Union named after J.S.Bach”, Germany, Leipzig, 1994. Arif Mirzoyev is one of the donators of Organ Library named after Robin Langley.

Biography
Arif Mirzoyev was born in Baku into a family with deep musical traditions. He learnt composer’s mastery at Azerbaijan State Conservatoire named after Uzeyir Hajibeyov, in Gara Garayev’s class. He undergone training on theory and history of organ arts at N.Malina and performing mastery of organ at S.Dijur at Moscow Conservatory named after P.I.Tchaikovsky. Arif Mirzoyev combined creative activity with pedagogic one.

Creative conception
Opening of “Polistylistics in the sphere of neo-renaissance music of the East and West”, the essence of matter of which is union of tonal music of the East – mugham, European baroque and German classic polyphony, and also spiritual music of various religious confessions – Islam, Protestant and Catholic music, is the main creative conception of Arif Mirzoyev.

Mirzoyev is also the author of the great amount of chamber-instrumental vocal and jazz music. At present he lives in Fulda, Germany.

References

Azerbaijani composers
Soviet composers
Soviet male composers
20th-century classical composers
Azerbaijani organists
Male organists
Azerbaijani classical pianists
Musicians from Baku
Baku Academy of Music alumni
1944 births
Living people
Male classical composers
Male classical pianists
21st-century classical pianists
21st-century organists
20th-century male musicians
21st-century male musicians